The 2014 Indiana Hoosiers football team represented Indiana University during the 2014 NCAA Division I FBS football season. The Hoosiers played in the East division, a new division of the Big Ten Conference, and played their home games at Memorial Stadium in Bloomington, Indiana. The team was led by head coach Kevin Wilson, which was his fourth season. They finished the season 4–8, 1–7 in Big Ten play to finish in last place in the East Division.

Preseason

Recruits

Coaching staff

Schedule

Roster

2015 NFL draftees

References

Indiana
Indiana Hoosiers football seasons
Indiana Hoosiers football